Michael Radanovics (born 19 March 1958) is an Austrian violinist (jazz and classic) and composer.

Life 
Born in Steyr, Radanovics passed his school-leaving examination in 1976. He studied violin with Michael Frischenschlager from 1977 to 1985 and music education at the University of Music and Performing Arts Vienna from 1978 to 1981.

From 1982 to 1985 he was a member of the jazz band Augmented Nine, and from 1983 to 1988 of the symphony orchestra of the Volksoper Wien. Since 1988 he has played in the Radio-Symphony Orchestra Wien. In 1987 he co-founded the Motus Quartet, playing as primarius until 2000. Radanovics composed and arranged jazz and improvised music for the instrumentation. Concert tours have taken him through Europe, America, and Asia.

Radanovics has published educational literature with Universal Edition since 1990. In 2003 he founded the duo Zimt & Zauber with the singer Petra Hartl.

Since 1996, Radanovics has been a member of the Swiss composers group Groupe Lacroix.

Awards 
 1994: 2. Prize at the Leibnitz Art Prize for Jazz Composition (for Metafile for Frank)
 1998: 3. Prize at the Franz Joseph Reindl Composition Competition.
 2003: 3. (for Das Wunder der Zahlen)
 2007: Winner of the "Vinum et Litterae" competition, Krems on the Danube

Publications 
 1990: Jazzy Violin 1 (Universal Edition)
 1992: Jazzy Violin 2 (Universal Edition)
 1993: Liederbuch Fuer 2 Geigen (Universal Edition)
 1994: Children’s songs (Universal Edition)
 1994: Jazzy Cello 1 (Universal Edition)
 1995: Favorites (Universal Edition)
 1998: Folk & Fiddle (Universal Edition)
 1999: Riffs & Tunes (Doblinger Verlag)

Discography 
 1994: Crimson Flames (Creative Works Records) with the Motus Quartett
 2003: Groupe Lacroix: 8 Pieces on Paul Klee (Creative Works Records) with the Ensemble Sortisatio
 2006: Train Songs (CCNC) with the Spring String Quartet
 2008: Wo der Wind herwaht with Petra Hartl
 2009: In mir daham (Extraplatte) with Petra Hartl
 2011: MondoLine/Du Liebst (Sturm & Klang) with Konstantin Wecker

Literature 
  Radanovics, Michael. Online-edition, Vienna 2002 ff., ; Print edition: Volume 4, published by the Austrian Academy of Sciences, Vienna 2005.
 Radanovics, Michael. In Axel Schniederjürgen (ed.): Kürschners Musiker-Handbuch. 5th edition, Saur Verlag, Munich 2006, .

References

External links 
 
 Michael Radanovics at Music Information Center Austria
 

1958 births
Living people
People from Steyr
Jazz violinists
Austrian classical violinists
Austrian folk singers
20th-century classical composers
20th-century Austrian composers
20th-century Austrian male musicians
Austrian music arrangers
University of Music and Performing Arts Vienna alumni
20th-century jazz composers